Sufetula is a genus of moths of the family Crambidae.

Species
Where known, distribution records are given.

Sufetula alychnopa (Turner, 1908)
Sufetula anania Solis, Hayden, Sanabria, Gonzalez, Ujueta & Gulbronson, 2019 (from Costa Rica)
Sufetula bilinealis Hampson, 1912
Sufetula brunnealis Hampson, 1917
Sufetula carbonalis Hayden, 2013
Sufetula chagosalis (T. B. Fletcher, 1910) (from Chagos)
Sufetula choreutalis (Snellen, 1879)
Sufetula cyanolepis Hampson, 1912
Sufetula diminutalis (Walker, 1866) (from North America)
Sufetula dulcinalis (Snellen, 1899)
Sufetula grumalis Schaus, 1920
Sufetula hemiophthalma (Meyrick, 1884)
Sufetula hypocharopa Dyar, 1914
Sufetula hypochiralis Dyar, 1914
Sufetula macropalpia Hampson, 1899
Sufetula melanophthalma E. Hering, 1901
Sufetula minimalis T. B. Fletcher, 1910 (from Seychelles)
Sufetula minuscula Inoue, 1996
Sufetula nigrescens Hampson, 1912 (from Africa and Madagascar)
Sufetula nitidalis Hampson, 1908 (from India)
Sufetula obliquistrialis Hampson, 1912
Sufetula polystrialis Hampson, 1912
Sufetula pygmaea Hampson, 1912
Sufetula rectifascialis Hampson, 1896 (from Sri Lanka)
Sufetula sacchari (Seín, 1930)
Sufetula sufetuloides (Hampson, 1917) (from Nigeria and Sierra Leone)
Sufetula sunidesalis Walker, 1859 (from Sri Lanka)
Sufetula sythoffi (Snellen, 1899)
Sufetula trichophysetis Hampson, 1912 (from Ghana)

References

Crambidae genera